The 1967–68 Coppa Italia, the 21st Coppa Italia was an Italian Football Federation domestic cup competition won by Torino.

Serie A

First round 

* Varese qualify after drawing of lots.

Second round 

The four winners qualify for the Quarter–finals.

Serie B

First round 

* Lazio qualify after drawing of lots.

Intermediate round

Second round 

The four winners qualify for the Quarter–finals and the two groups will be added together.

Quarter–finals

Final group

Top goalscorers

References
rsssf.com

Coppa Italia seasons
Coppa Italia, 1967–68
1967–68 domestic association football cups